The Medicine Line is a Canadian documentary television series that was created and produced by Farpoint Films and premiered in Canada in 2014 on APTN. The show starred Dave Gaudet.

The show won a Golden Sheaf Award for Best Documentary Series at the 2014 Yorkton Film Festival.

Episodes
Here is a list of the episodes of the documentary TV series.

References

External links
 
 
 The Medicine Line on APTN 

Aboriginal Peoples Television Network original programming
2014 Canadian television series debuts
Television shows set in North America
Canadian travel television series
2010s Canadian documentary television series
First Nations television series